Abbas Kola may refer to:
 Abbas Kola, Babol
 Abbas Kola, Chalus
 Abbas Kola, Nur